Poland competed at the 2022 Winter Paralympics in Beijing, China which took place between 4–13 March 2022.

Competitors
The following is the list of number of competitors participating at the Games per sport/discipline.

Alpine skiing

Igor Sikorski and Andrzej Szczęsny competed in alpine skiing.

Biathlon

Poland competed in biathlon.

Cross-country skiing

Poland competed in cross-country skiing.

Snowboarding

One snowboarder competed in snowboarding.

Banked slalom

Snowboard cross

Qualification legend: Q - Qualify to next round; FA - Qualify to medal final; FB - Qualify to consolation final

See also
Poland at the Paralympics
Poland at the 2022 Winter Olympics

References

Nations at the 2022 Winter Paralympics
2022
Winter Paralympics